In Greek mythology, the name Thero (Ancient Greek: Θηρώ means "feral, beastly") may refer to:

Thero, reputed nurse of Ares. Local inhabitants of Therapne in Sparta believed that Theriates, a surname of Ares, had been derived from her name. Pausanias remarks that outside Therapne, Thero was completely unknown to the Greeks, and supposes that this mythological figure could have been of Colchian origin, considering the fact that the statue of Ares Theriates was believed to have been brought from Colchis by the Dioscuri.
Thero, daughter of Phylas and Leipephilene, and sister of Hippotes. She was said to have been beautiful as the moonbeams. Falling in love with Apollo, Thero became the mother of Chaeron, eponym of Chaeronea.
Thero, a follower of Artemis.

See also
 Thero (disambiguation)

Notes

References 

 Pausanias, Description of Greece with an English Translation by W.H.S. Jones, Litt.D., and H.A. Ormerod, M.A., in 4 Volumes. Cambridge, MA, Harvard University Press; London, William Heinemann Ltd. 1918. . Online version at the Perseus Digital Library
Pausanias, Graeciae Descriptio. 3 vols. Leipzig, Teubner. 1903.  Greek text available at the Perseus Digital Library.
 Stephanus of Byzantium, Stephani Byzantii Ethnicorum quae supersunt, edited by August Meineike (1790-1870), published 1849. A few entries from this important ancient handbook of place names have been translated by Brady Kiesling. Online version at the Topos Text Project.

Women of Apollo
Women in Greek mythology
Characters in Greek mythology